George Allen Upward (Worcester 20 September 1863 – Wimborne 12 November 1926) was a British poet, lawyer, politician and teacher.
His work was included in the first anthology of Imagist poetry, Des Imagistes, which was edited by Ezra Pound and published in 1914. He was a first cousin once removed of Edward Upward. His parents were George and Mary Upward, and he was survived by an elder sister (Mary) Edith Upward.

Upward was brought up as a member of the Plymouth Brethren and trained as a lawyer at the Royal University of Dublin (now University College Dublin). While living in Dublin, he wrote a pamphlet in favour of Irish Home Rule.

Upward later worked for the British Foreign Office in Kenya as a judge. Back in Britain, he defended Havelock Wilson and other labour leaders and ran for election as a Lib-Lab candidate, taking 659 votes in Merthyr at the 1895 general election.

He wrote two books of poetry, Songs of Ziklag (1888) and Scented Leaves from a Chinese Jar. He also published a translation Sayings of Confucious and a volume of autobiography, Some Personalities (1921).

Upward wrote a number of now-forgotten novels: The Prince of Balkistan (1895), A Crown of Straw (1896), A Bride's Madness (1897), The Accused Princess (1900) (source: Duncan, p. xii), "''The International Spy: Being a Secret History of the Russo-Japanese War" (1905), and Athelstane Ford. His 1910 novel "The Discovery of the Dead" is a collected fantasy (listed in Bleiler) dealing with the emerging science of Necrology.

His 1913 book The Divine Mystery is an anthropological study of Christian mythology.

In 1908, Upward self-published a book (originally written in 1901) which he apparently thought would be Nobel Prize material: The New Word. This book is today known as the first citation of the word "Scientology", however there was no delineation in this book of its definition by Upward. It is unknown whether L. Ron Hubbard, the founder of the Scientology-organization, knew of this book.

In 1917 the British Museum refused to take Upward's manuscripts, "on the grounds that the writer was still alive," and Upward burned them (source: Duncan, p. xi).

He shot himself in November 1926. Ezra Pound would a decade later satirically remark that this was due to his disappointment after hearing of George Bernard Shaw's Nobel Prize award which Shaw won in 1925.

Books
’’Secrets of the Courts of Europe’’. Pearson’s Magazine, (serialized, 1896)
’’The Princess of Balkistan’’, 1895
’’A Crown of Straw’’, 1896
’’A Bride’s Madness’’, 1897
’’The Accused Princess’’, 1900
’’Secret History of To-Day, Being Revelations of a Diplomatic Spy’’, 1904
’’The Queen against Owen’’. Date of first publication unknown but before 1923
’’Athelstane Ford’’. Date of first publication unknown but before 1923
’’The Ordeal of Fire’’. Date of first publication unknown but before 1923
’’The Discovery of the Dead’’, 1910
’’The Yellow Hand’’. Serialised: Dublin Evening Telegraph, 1921
’’The House of Sin’’. Serialised: Dublin Evening Telegraph, 1923
"The Club of Masks", 1926

Stage Plays
’’A Flan in the Pan’’, 1896

References
 
 Sheldon, Michael. Introduction to Scented Leaves from a Chinese Jar, A Selection. (Interim Press, 1987).
 Robert Duncan. Introduction to The Divine Mystery. (Ross-Erikson, Santa Barbara, 1976).
 Pound, Ezra. Selected Letters 1907-1941. (New Directions, 1950)

External links 
 
 
 

1863 births
1926 deaths
1926 suicides
20th-century British male writers
British male poets
British poets
Imagists
Liberal-Labour (UK) politicians